Årstaviken is a bay in the Eastern parts of Lake Mälaren in Sweden. It is bordered by the Södermalm, Liljeholmen and Årsta neighborhoods of Stockholm.

Geography of Stockholm
Landforms of Stockholm County
Bays of Sweden